The Lewis Flyers are the athletic teams that represent Lewis University, located in Romeoville (a suburb of Chicago), Illinois, United States, in intercollegiate sports as a member of the Division II level of the National Collegiate Athletic Association (NCAA), primarily competing in the Great Lakes Valley Conference (GLVC) for most of its sports since the 1980–81 academic year; while its men's volleyball team compete in the Midwestern Intercollegiate Volleyball Association (MIVA). Since it is not a sponsored sport at the Division II level, the men's volleyball team is the only program that plays in Division I.

Prior to joining the NCAA, Lewis was a member of the National Association of Intercollegiate Athletics (NAIA), primarily competing in the Chicagoland Collegiate Athletic Conference (CCAC) from 1954–55 to 1979–80.

Varsity teams
Lewis competes in 22 intercollegiate varsity sports: Men's sports include baseball, basketball, bowling, cross country, golf, lacrosse, soccer, swimming, tennis, track & field and volleyball; while women's sports include basketball, bowling, cross country, golf, lacrosse, soccer, softball, swimming, tennis, track & field and volleyball.

National championships

Team

Individual teams

Men's volleyball
The men's volleyball team is the only program that plays in Division I, even though they are a Division II Program. In 2003 the men's volleyball team won the NCAA Division I/II National Collegiate Men's Volleyball Championship, defeating BYU in the final, but it later voluntarily gave back its title after an internal investigation found ineligibility issues that were kept private from the NCAA.  This disgrace hurt the program for a few years, but they have slowly climbed their way back into the Top-10 rankings of DI-II schools. The Flyers qualified for the NCAA Championship and participated in the 1998 Final Four. In 1998 the Flyers also won their conference title. The Flyers were runners-up to Loyola, IL in the 2015 NCAA Final. More recently, the Flyers won the MIVA Conference Tournament in both 2019 & 2021. During both seasons, they made it as far as the NCAA Final Four in their playoff push.

Baseball
As a member of the NAIA, the Flyers won the NAIA Baseball World Series in 1974, 1975, and 1976 and finished as runners-up in 1966 and 1980.

Club sports
Lewis also competes intercollegiately in rugby as a member of the Chicago Area Rugby Football Union (CARFU).

References

External links